Mackenzies Bay is a small inlet in the coast between Bondi Beach and Tamarama Beach in the Eastern Suburbs of Sydney, New South Wales. It forms part of the shoreline boundary of the suburb of Tamarama. Most of the time, it is a rocky inlet but, at times, depending on prevailing conditions, a sandy beach—known informally as Mackenzies Bay Beach or Mackenzies—comes into existence. Mackenzies Bay is also a well-known surf break.

In recent years, the beach existed at times during 2007, 2016, and 2019. Because it is not a permanent beach and is not patrolled, whenever it exists, the beach has become, de facto, a 'dog-friendly beach'.

In the years up to 1947, the beach typically appeared around December and then disappeared around March, with the arrival of southerly gales. The beach then did not reappear until near the end of October 1951.  The beach next reappeared in November 1953. In 1997, there was so much sand that, at low tide, it was almost possible to walk between Tamarama and South Bondi. In the years between 1997 and 2007, there was no beach. Unusually, in 2007, the beach arrived in May and disappeared in August. In September 2016 and December 2019, the beach followed its more typical pattern and appeared in time for the beginning of the Australian summer. 

The area was occupied by local Aborigines, before their dispossession in the years after Sydney was established in 1788. There is a rock engraving at Mackenzies Point depicting marine life. The age of the engraving is not known, but could be up to 2,000 years old.

Mackenzies Bay and nearby Mackenzies Point are named after the Mackenzie family who, from the 1860s to approximately 1926, ran the Waverley Dairy on farmlands that stretched from near the corner of Bondi Road and Denham Street, east to the coast, and as far south as Gaerloch Avenue, Tamarama.

References 

Sydney localities
Beaches of Sydney

External links 
Bondi to Coogee urban coastal walking path

Surfing locations in New South Wales